Ronan Maher (born 9 October 1995)  is an Irish hurler who plays for Tipperary Senior Championship club Thurles Sarsfields and at inter-county level alongside his brother Pádraic with the Tipperary senior hurling team. He usually lines out as a left wing-back.

Playing career

Thurles CBS

Maher first came to prominence as a hurler with Thurles CBS. He played in every grade before eventually joining the college's senior team and lined out in several Harty Cup campaigns.

Mary Immaculate College

During his studies at Mary Immaculate College, Maher was selected for the college's senior hurling team during his second year. On 27 February 2016, he lined out at right wing-back when Mary Immaculate College faced the University of Limerick in the Ftzgibbon Cup final. Maher ended the game with a winners' medal following the 1-30 to 3-22 victory.

On 25 February 2017, Maher again lined out at centre-back when Mary Immaculate College qualified for a second successive Ftzgibbon Cup final. He scored four points, including three from frees, and claimed a second successive winners' medal after a 3-24 to 1-19 defeat of the Carlow Institute of Technology.

Thurles Sarsfields

Maher joined the Thurles Sarsfields club at a young age and played in all grades at juvenile and underage levels. He won four Tipperary Under-21 Championship medals with the club between 2012 and 2016. Maher was added to the Thurles Sarsfields senior team for the 2012 Tipperary Senior Championship.

On 14 October 2012, Maher was a non-playing substitute when Thurles Sarsfields faced Drom-Inch in the final. He remained on the bench for the entire game but ended with a winners' medal following a 1-21 to 2-15 victory. On 25 November 2012, Maher won a Munster Championship medal when he came on as an injury-time substitute in the 1-21 to 1-16 defeat of De La Salle.

After surrendering their titles in 2013, Maher lined out in a second final on 2 November 2014. He claimed a second winners' medal, his first on the field of play, when he lined out at right wing-back following Thurles Sarsfields 2-22 to 3-11 defeat of reigning champions Loughmore-Castleiney. 

On 25 October 2015, Maher was at left wing-back when Thurles Sarsfields faced Nenagh Éire Óg in the Tipperary Senior Championship final. He ended the game with a third winners' medal following the 1-18 to 3-11 victory.

Maher lined out at left wing-back when Thurles Sarsfields faced Kiladangan in the Tipperary Senior Championship final. He ended the game as man of the match in the 0-27 to 1-15 victory.

On 8 October 2017, Maher lined out at right wing-back in a fourth successive final. He scored a point from play and ended the game with a fifth winners' medal following the 1-24 to 0-11 defeat of Borris-Ileigh.

In July 2022, in the first round of the 2022 Tipperary Senior Hurling Championship against Borris-Ileigh, Maher broke a bone in his leg and was ruled out for the rest of the championship.

Tipperary

Minor and under-21

Maher was just 16-years-old when he was selected for the Tipperary minor hurling team in advance of the 2012 Munster Championship. He made his first appearance for the team on 2 May 2012 when he lined out at right wing-back in a 6-21 to 0-11 defeat of Kerry. On 15 July 2012, Ronan won a Munster Championship medal when he lined out at left corner-back in a 1-16 to 1-12 defeat of Clare in the final. He was switched to right corner-back when Tipperary drew 2-13 to 1-16 with Dublin in the All-Ireland final. Maher was again at right corner-forward for the replay on 30 September 2012. He ended the game with an All-Ireland medal following the 2-18 to 1-11 victory.

Maher was switched to centre-back for the 2013 Munster Championship. He played his last game on the grade on 26 June 2013 in a 1-17 to 0-17 defeat by Limerick on 26 June 2013.

Maher joined the Tipperary under-21 hurling panel in advance of the 2014 Munster Championship. He made his first appearance for the team on 16 July 2014 when he lined out at right wing-back in a 5-19 to 1-25 defeat by Clare.

After a disappointing 2015 Munster Championship, Maher was selected for the under-21 team for a third successive season in 2016. On 27 July, he lined out at right wing-back in a 2-19 to 0-15 defeat by Waterford in the Munster final.

Senior

On 12 January 2014, Maher made his competitive debut for the Tipperary senior team in a 3-20 to 0-05 defeat of the Limerick Institute of Technology in the Waterford Crystal Cup. He claimed a winners' medal in that competition on 7 February 2014,as Tipperary defeated Clare by 4-22 to 3-11 in the decider. Maher made his National League debut on 15 February 2014 when he came on as a 59th-minute substitute for James Woodlock in a 2-13 to 0-16 defeat of Waterford. On 4 May 2014, he was an unused substitute when Tipperary suffered a 2-25 to 1-27 defeat by Kilkenny in the National League final. 

On 12 July 2015, Maher was selected at left wing-back when Tipperary faced Waterford in the Munster final. He ended the game with a winners' medal following the 0-21 to 0-16 victory.

Maher claimed a second successive Munster Championship medal on 10 July 2016 after lining out at centre-back in a 5-19 to 0-13 defeat of Waterford in the final. On 5 September 2016, he again lined out at centre-back for Tipperary's All-Ireland final meeting with Kilkenny. Maher ended the game with an All-Ireland medal following a 2-29 to 2-20 victory. He ended the season by winning an All-Star award.

On 23 April 2017, Maher lined out at centre-back in his first National League final. He ended the game on the losing side after scoring two points in the 3-21 to 0-14 defeat by Galway.

Maher played in a second consecutive National League final on 8 April 2018. Lining out at centre-back, he ended the game on the losing side following a 2-23 to 2-17 defeat by Kilkenny.

On 30 June 2019, Maher lined out at left wing-back and scored two points from play when Tipperary suffered a 2-26 to 2-14 defeat by Limerick in the Munster final. On 18 August 2019, he was selected at full-back when Tipperary faced Kilkenny in the All-Ireland final. Maher ended the game with a second All-Ireland winners' medal following the 3-25 to 0-20 victory. He ended the season by being named in the full-back position on the All-Star team.

In February 2022, Maher was named as the new captain of the Tipperary team.

Career statistics

Honours

Mary Immaculate College
Fitzgibbon Cup (2): 2016, 2017

Thurles Sarsfields
Munster Senior Club Hurling Championship (1): 2012
Tipperary Senior Hurling Championship (5): 2012, 2014, 2015, 2016, 2017
Tipperary Under-21 Hurling Championship (4): 2012, 2013, 2015, 2016

Tipperary
All-Ireland Senior Hurling Championship (2): 2016, 2019
Munster Senior Hurling Championship (2): 2015, 2016
Waterford Crystal Cup (1): 2014 
All-Ireland Minor Hurling Championship (1): 2012
Munster Minor Hurling Championship (1): 2012

Individual
All Star Award (2): 2016, 2019
The Sunday Game Team of the Year (2): 2016, 2019

References

1995 births
Living people
Thurles Sarsfields hurlers
Tipperary inter-county hurlers
Hurling backs
All-Ireland Senior Hurling Championship winners
Alumni of Mary Immaculate College, Limerick